Skillicorn is a surname. Notable people with the surname include:

 Alice Skillicorn (1894–1979), British academic
 Allen Skillicorn, American politician
 Dennis Skillicorn (1959–2009), American murderer